Paramecyna x-signatum is a species of beetle in the family Cerambycidae. It was described by Per Olof Christopher Aurivillius in 1910. It can be found in South Africa, Kenya, Angola and Namibia.

References

Apomecynini
Beetles described in 1910
Beetles of Africa